Aegomorphus travassosi is a species of beetle in the family Cerambycidae. It was described by Monné & Magno in 1992.

References

Aegomorphus
Beetles described in 1992